The LSWR C8 class was the first class of 4-4-0 express steam locomotives designed by Dugald Drummond for the London and South Western Railway and introduced in 1898. According to Dendy Marshall they "were of orthodox design, very much like engines which Drummond had put on the Caledonian". Dendy Marshall gives few other details, except to say that they were numbered 290-299 and had 18 in x 26 in cylinders. H.C. Casserley states that they were very similar to the Caledonian Railway 66 class.

They used a similar boiler to the Drummond M7 0-4-4T and 700 class 0-6-0 engines built for the LSWR. They originally used a similar tender to the 700 class, but these were later replaced with Drummond's eight-wheeled bogie "watercart" tenders. They were not particularly good steamers, due to their firebox being too small. None were ever superheated, and they were withdrawn after service lives of 35 to40 years. In November 1898, No. 291 worked a train carrying the Grand Duke and Duchess Serge of Russia from Windsor through to Dover on the LCDR.

Withdrawal

References

C08
4-4-0 locomotives
Railway locomotives introduced in 1898
Standard gauge steam locomotives of Great Britain